Battle of Bergen may refer to:
 Sacking of Bergen (1393); first Victual Brothers sack of Bergen

 Battle of Bergen (1677) in which the Danes invaded the Swedish-held island of Rügen
 Battle of Bergen (1759)
 Battle of Bergen (1799)
 Battle of Mons (1914), called Bergen in Flemish